The Emission Database for Global Atmospheric Research (EDGAR) is a joint project of the European Commission Joint Research Centre and the Netherlands Environmental Assessment Agency which estimates emissions of all greenhouse gases, air pollutants and aerosols.

References

Air pollution
European research networks
Greenhouse gas inventories